Sonny Strait is an American voice actor, ADR director, and writer at Funimation, known for his work on a number of English versions of Japanese anime series and as an illustrator for the independently published comic book series Elfquest.

Career
Strait began voicing Krillin in the English dub version of Dragon Ball for Funimation in 1999. He has since consistently voiced the kid, teen and adult incarnations of Krillin in every anime series produced to date (Dragon Ball, Z, GT, Kai and Super) and numerous of animated movies and video game adaptations, as well as other characters such as Bardock. 

Besides voicing Krillin in Dragon Ball, Strait has worked on many popular animated characters including Usopp in One Piece, Maes Hughes in Fullmetal Alchemist, and Cartoon Network’s laid back, robot host Toonami TOM, until the T.I.E., The Intruder, when he was replaced by Steve Blum. He has also worked as a writer and director on several TV series including Dragon Ball Z, Case Closed, and Lupin the Third.

As a comic book artist, Strait has 17 published works to date. Strait's self-published debut work, Mr. Average, was featured in The Comics Journal and Elfquest.

In 2007, he wrote and illustrated a graphic novel about reluctant punk rock, faerie princess named Goat. The book, called We Shadows, was published by Tokyopop and was nominated by The American Library Association for Best Graphic Novel in 2008. The book received glowing reviews in many trade magazines including Publishers Weekly, Newtype, Play and Anime Insider.

In 2009, Strait voiced the titular character in the Xbox game 'Splosion Man.

Strait is also a voice actor in the anime Black Clover as King Clover.

Personal life 
Strait has been married three times. He married Davina Lynn Copsy on June 26, 1986. They divorced on April 7, 1992. On June 20, 1992, Strait married Alicia Lang Leath. Strait's second marriage ended in divorce on November 15, 1995. In 2002, Strait married his third wife, Gayla Jackson. Strait is the stepfather of Gayla's children: Savannah and James.

Dubbing roles

Anime

Film

Video games

Comics
 The Atomic Punk
 B-Side Beat
 Car Bombs (Web Comic)
 Darwin's
 ElfQuest: In All But Blood
 ElfQuest: Wolfshadow
 Goth Metal Gods
 Jack
 Mr. Average
 Muff Dyver and the Sex Gophers from Hell
 We Shadows
 ElfQuest: The Final Quest (color artist)
 ElfQuest: Stargazer's Hunt (comic artist)

References

External links
 
 
 
 

1965 births
Living people
American male video game actors
American male voice actors
American comics writers
American comics artists
American voice directors
Funimation
People from Kaufman, Texas
Mesquite High School (Texas) alumni